H. Tjut Djalil (11 October 1927 – 28 May 2014) was an Indonesian film director and screenwriter. His feature directorial debut was the 1974 film Benyamin Spion 025. He is also known for directing cult films such as Mystics in Bali (1981), Lady Terminator (1989) and Dangerous Seductress (1995).

References

External links
 

1927 births
2014 deaths
Indonesian film directors
Indonesian screenwriters
Action film directors
Fantasy film directors
Horror film directors